Bromelia hemisphaerica is a plant species in the genus Bromelia. This species is native to Mexico and Costa Rica.

References

hemisphaerica
Flora of Costa Rica
Flora of Mexico